Union Township is a township in Kingman County, Kansas, USA.  As of the 2000 census, its population was 88.

Geography
Union Township covers an area of 36.23 square miles (93.84 square kilometers); of this, 0.09 square miles (0.24 square kilometers) or 0.26 percent is water. The streams of Mead Creek, Painter Creek and Pat Creek run through this township.

Unincorporated towns
 Calista
(This list is based on USGS data and may include former settlements.)

Adjacent townships
 Eureka Township (north)
 Hoosier Township (northeast)
 Ninnescah Township (east)
 Belmont Township (southeast)
 Peters Township (south)
 Kingman Township (southwest)
 Rural Township (west)
 Dresden Township (northwest)

References
 U.S. Board on Geographic Names (GNIS)
 United States Census Bureau cartographic boundary files

External links
 US-Counties.com
 City-Data.com

Townships in Kingman County, Kansas
Townships in Kansas